Maria Chiara Baccini (born 21 July 1981) is a former Italian long jumper.

Biography
Winner of two international medals at the junior level (a World bronze and a European gold), she was twice the absolute Italian champion (it happened in 1998 at just 17 years, and she is one of only two female athletes who ever be able to win a senior title by junior), with her personal best of 6.55 m is still holding 9th Italian performance all-time and this result is still junior Italian record.

Achievements

National titles
She won two national championships at senior level,
Italian Athletics Championships
Long jump: 1998
Italian Athletics Indoor Championships
Long jump: 2001

See also
 Italian all-time lists - Long jump

References

External links
 

1981 births
Living people
Italian female long jumpers
21st-century Italian women